John Felix Charles Badcock known as Felix Badcock (1935-2015), was a male rower who competed for England.

Rowing career
He represented England and won a bronze medal in the eights at the 1958 British Empire and Commonwealth Games in Cardiff, Wales.

The eights crew consisted entirely of members of the Thames Rowing Club and who won the final of the Empire Games Trials from the 1st and 3rd Trinity Boat Club, Cambridge.

Personal life
His father was John Badcock (also known as Felix) and his mother was Joyce Cooper. His brother Francis 'David' M Badcock (born 1937), also rowed for the Thames RC and was a reserve for 1958 Commonwealth games crew in addition to rowing in the 1958 boat race.

He died in 2015.

References

1935 births
2015 deaths
English male rowers
Commonwealth Games medallists in rowing
Commonwealth Games bronze medallists for England
Rowers at the 1958 British Empire and Commonwealth Games
Medallists at the 1958 British Empire and Commonwealth Games